Gregory Blake Smith (born 1951), is an American novelist and short story writer. His novel, The Divine Comedy of John Venner, was named a Notable Book of 1992 by The New York Times Book Review and his short story collection The Law of Miracles won the 2010 Juniper Prize for Fiction and the 2012 Minnesota Book Award.

Smith holds an undergraduate degree from Bowdoin College and an M.F.A. from the Iowa Writers' Workshop. He has been the George Bennett Fellow at Phillips Exeter Academy and a Wallace Stegner Fellow at Stanford University.  He is currently the Lloyd P. Johnson Norwest Professor of English and the Liberal Arts at Carleton College.

Works
The Devil in the Dooryard (novel), New York: William Morrow, 1986, and London: William Collins, 1987, 
The Divine Comedy of John Venner (novel), New York: Poseidon Press, 1992, 
The Madonna of Las Vegas (novel), New York: Three Rivers Press, 2005, 
The Law of Miracles (short stories), Amherst: University of Massachusetts Press, 2011, 
The Maze at Windermere (novel), Viking, January, 2018,

Honors 

Transatlantic Award, Henfield Foundation, 1982
George Bennett Fellow, Phillips Exeter Academy, 1983
Stegner Fellow, Stanford University, 1984
James A. Michener Award, Copernicus Society, 1985
National Endowment for the Arts Literary Fellowship, 1988, 2009
Pushcart Prize, 2006
Juniper Prize for Fiction, 2010
Lawrence Foundation Award, 2012
Minnesota Book Award for Fiction, 2012

References

External links 

 “Missing, Believed Wiped,” (short story)
 “Destroying Herman Yoder,” (short story)
 “A Few Moral Problems You Might Like to Ponder, of a Winter’s Evening, in Front of the Fire, with a Cat on Your Lap” (short story)
 Cosmo Dust Versus Mr. Universe (interview)

Living people
1951 births
20th-century American novelists
21st-century American novelists
American male novelists
20th-century American male writers
21st-century American male writers
Stegner Fellows